The 2022–23 Western Football League season (known as the 2022–23 Toolstation Western Football League for sponsorship reasons) is the 121st in the history of the Western Football League, a football competition in England. Teams were divided into two divisions; the Premier and the First. 

The constitution was announced on 12 May 2022.

With a view to a merger between the Western League and the South West Peninsula League in 2023–24, four clubs were to be automatically promoted from Division One to Step 5, depending on ground grading. The fifth-placed club may also have been be promoted, on a PPG (points per game) basis. However, the FA scrapped the merger in February 2023 after a breakdown in negotiations, and promotion was reverted to two clubs, one via a play-off.

Premier Division
The Premier Division was increased to 20 clubs from 19 after Exmouth Town and Tavistock were promoted to the Southern League South Division, and Bridport were relegated to the South West Peninsula League Premier Division East. Brislington requested demotion to Division One, which the league accepted.

Five new clubs joined the division.
Promoted from Division One:
Sherborne Town
Welton Rovers

Promoted from the South West Peninsula League Premier Division East:
Torpoint Athletic

Promoted from the South West Peninsula League Premier Division West:
Falmouth Town

Relegated from the Southern League Division One South:
Barnstaple Town

League table

First Division
The First Division was increased from 21 clubs to 22 after Sherborne Town and Welton Rovers were promoted to the Premier Division, and Devizes Town were relegated.

Four new clubs joined:
Brislington, voluntarily demoted from the Premier Division
Hallen, relegated from the Hellenic Football League Premier Division
Nailsea & Tickenham, promoted from the Somerset County League
Shirehampton, promoted from the Gloucestershire County Football League

Lebeq United changed their name to FC Bristol.

League table

References
 League tables

External links
 Western League Official Site

2022–23
9